James Joseph Paxson (born July 9, 1957) is an American former professional basketball player. A first round selection (12th overall) of the Portland Trail Blazers in the 1979 NBA draft, Paxson played for Portland and the Boston Celtics of the NBA from 1979–1990 and was twice an All-Star. Paxson served as general manager of the Cleveland Cavaliers for six years and now works as a consultant with the Chicago Bulls where his brother John Paxson is an executive.

Pre-NBA
Paxson, a guard-forward born in Kettering, Ohio and the son of former NBA player Jim Paxson Sr., played college basketball at the University of Dayton. When the older Paxson tried out for the Dayton Flyers, he couldn't afford to buy athletic shoes, so athletic director Thomas Frericks loaned him a pair. Paxson was a three-time team MVP and earned All-America honors as a senior after averaging more than 23 points per game. He also averaged 17 points as a junior and 18 points as a sophomore at Dayton.

Career
The 6-foot-6 Paxson was an NBA All-Star in 1983 and 1984. He also earned All-NBA Second Team honors in 1984 after averaging 21 points per game.  He spent nine seasons with Portland (1979–1988) and, after being traded to Boston in February 1988, spent two full seasons with Boston (1988–1990).  When he was traded from Portland, he left as the team's all-time leading scorer.

Post-playing career
After retiring in 1990 at the age of 32, Paxson joined Portland's front office as assistant general manager. In September 1998, he was named vice president of basketball operations for the Cleveland Cavaliers.  He was promoted to general manager in 1999, serving in that position until he was fired in April 2005.  The Cavaliers won 185 games and lost 307 games in the six years Paxson was general manager.

In July 2006, Paxson, the older brother of former Chicago Bulls guard and former Chicago Bulls Executive Vice President of basketball operations John Paxson, was hired as a consultant for the Bulls. Paxson was inducted into the Oregon Sports Hall of Fame in 1998.  In 2004, he was named to the University of Dayton's All-Century Team.

NBA career statistics

Regular season 

|-
| style="text-align:left;"| 
| style="text-align:left;"|Portland
| 72 || – || 17.6 || .411 || .045 || .711 || 1.5 || 2.0 || .7 || .1 || 6.2
|-
| style="text-align:left;"| 
| style="text-align:left;"|Portland
| 79 || – || 34.2 || .536 || .067 || .734 || 2.7 || 3.8 || 1.8 || .1 || 17.1
|-
| style="text-align:left;"| 
| style="text-align:left;"|Portland
| 82 || 82 || 33.6 || .526 || .229 || .767 || 2.7 || 3.4 || 1.6 || .1 || 18.9
|-
| style="text-align:left;"| 
| style="text-align:left;"|Portland
| 81 || 81 || 33.8 || .515 || .160 || .812 || 2.1 || 2.9 || 1.7 || .2 || 21.7
|-
| style="text-align:left;"| 
| style="text-align:left;"|Portland
| 81 || 81 || 33.2 || .514 || .288 || .841 || 2.1 || 3.1 || 1.5 || .1 || 21.3
|-
| style="text-align:left;"| 
| style="text-align:left;"|Portland
| 68 || 57 || 33.1 || .514 || .154 || .790 || 3.3 || 3.9 || 1.5 || .1 || 17.9
|-
| style="text-align:left;"| 
| style="text-align:left;"|Portland
| 75 || 31 || 25.7 || .470 || .323 || .889 || 2.0 || 3.7 || 1.3 || .1 || 13.1
|-
| style="text-align:left;"| 
| style="text-align:left;"|Portland
| 72 || 1 || 25.0 || .460 || .265 || .806 || 1.9 || 3.3 || 1.1 || .2 || 12.1
|-
| style="text-align:left;"| 
| style="text-align:left;"|Portland
| 17 || 1 || 15.5 || .402 || .375 || .778 || 1.1 || 1.6 || .4 || .1 || 6.1
|-
| style="text-align:left;"| 
| style="text-align:left;"|Boston
| 28 || 2 || 19.2 || .492 || .154 || .885 || 1.0 || 1.8 || .8 || .1 || 8.7
|-
| style="text-align:left;"| 
| style="text-align:left;"|Boston
| 57 || 7 || 20.0 || .454 || .167 || .816 || 1.3 || 1.9 || .7 || .1 || 8.6
|-
| style="text-align:left;"| 
| style="text-align:left;"|Boston
| 72 || 25 || 17.8 || .453 || .250 || .811 || 1.1 || 1.9 || .5 || .1 || 6.4
|- class="sortbottom"
| style="text-align:center;" colspan="2"| Career
| 784 || 368 || 27.2 || .498 || .225 || .807 || 2.0 || 2.9 || 1.2 || .1 || 14.3

|- class="sortbottom"
| style="text-align:center;" colspan="2"| All-Star
| 2 || 0 || 15.5 || .625 || – || .500 || 1.5 || 1.5 || 1.0 || .0 || 10.5

Playoffs 

|-
|style="text-align:left;"|1980
|style="text-align:left;”|Portland
|3||–||14.7||.313||–||1.000||1.3||1.0||.7||.3||5.3
|-
|style="text-align:left;"|1981
|style="text-align:left;”|Portland
|1||–||4.0||.000||–||–||.0||.0||.0||.0||0.0
|-
|style="text-align:left;"|1983
|style="text-align:left;”|Portland
|7||–||37.1||.586||.500||.758||2.1||2.6||1.3||.1||23.3
|-
|style="text-align:left;"|1984
|style="text-align:left;”|Portland
|5||–||34.4||.513||.200||.825||3.8||2.4||.4||.0||22.8
|-
|style="text-align:left;"|1985
|style="text-align:left;”|Portland
|9||0||23.6||.465||.300||.792||2.2||2.3||.7||.0||12.9
|-
|style="text-align:left;"|1986
|style="text-align:left;”|Portland
|4||0||17.8||.378||.333||.800||1.0||3.8||.8||.0||10.5
|-
|style="text-align:left;"|1987
|style="text-align:left;”|Portland
|4||0||23.5||.406||.000||.889||2.3||3.3||1.3||.0||8.5
|-
|style="text-align:left;"|1988
|style="text-align:left;”|Boston
|15||0||12.5||.288||.000||.800||.6||.7||.4||.1||3.3
|-
|style="text-align:left;"|1990
|style="text-align:left;”|Boston
|5||0||12.4||.500||.000||.750||.0||1.4||1.0||.0||3.8
|- class="sortbottom"
| style="text-align:center;" colspan="2"| Career
| 53 || 0 || 20.9 || .463 || .267 || .808 || 1.5 || 1.9 || .7 || .1 || 10.5

References

External links
Jim Paxson at NBA.com
NBA stats @ basketballreference.com
A Family Tradition – Sports Illustrated

1957 births
Living people
All-American college men's basketball players
American men's basketball players
Basketball players from Dayton, Ohio
Boston Celtics players
Cleveland Cavaliers executives
Dayton Flyers men's basketball players
National Basketball Association All-Stars
People from Kettering, Ohio
Portland Trail Blazers draft picks
Portland Trail Blazers executives
Portland Trail Blazers players
Shooting guards
Small forwards